John William Robinson (22 April 1870 – 28 October 1931) was a professional footballer who played for, among others, Derby County, Southampton and England.

Football career
Robinson was born in Derby and began playing football for local sides Derby St Neots and Derby Midland before moving to Lincoln City in 1888. After helping the Imps win the Midland Football League in 1890 he returned to his hometown and signed for Football League side Derby County. Robinson spent six seasons at Derby, making over 180 appearances, and was a key player in their 1895–96 campaign which saw them finish as runner-up to Aston Villa. He left Derby in 1897 and spent a season with New Brighton Tower before joining South Coast club Southampton.

He enjoyed a successful time with Southampton helping them to dominate the Southern League at the turn of the 20th century. As goalkeeper, Robinson was instrumental in a string of victories over top-flight sides in the F A Cup during this period, especially in getting to the 1900 FA Cup Final where infighting over the selection of an out of form English forward over the in-form Roddy McLeod of Scotland led to fighting between the English and Scottish factions and ultimately led to a very disjointed team performance and a heavy defeat.

Robinson was noted, during his playing career, for his reliability and was, according to author Francis Hodgson, among the first goalkeepers to dive full length to make saves. Touring eastern Europe with Southampton, Robinson played a notable role in introducing modern goalkeeping techniques to Austria and Hungary. In Prague, Southampton beat local Slavia 3–0 and Robinson's novel goalkeeping style of diving saves gave rise to the Czech term, "robinsonáda". Gyula Grosics, the Hungarian international of the 1950s, observed that "it was Moon of the Corinthians, Robinson, and many other world-famous England goalkeepers who have been the pioneers of this art, and they showed the way for all Europe's goalkeepers." Hugo Meisl, the noted coach of the Austrian "Wunderteam" of the 1930s, went further, recalling:

"In that year (1899) the first English professionals came over, Southampton F.C. They beat the Viennese city eleven 6–0 and their goalkeeper, Robinson, showed for the first time how to tackle low shots by flying through the air with the greatest of ease. Until this day (1930) that type of save is called a 'Robinsonade' in Austria and Central Europe. After the match, Robinson gave an exhibition. His goal was bombarded simultaneously with six balls and he blocked most of the shots."

Robinson left Southampton in 1903 and went on to play for fellow Southern League clubs Plymouth Argyle, Exeter City, Millwall and Stoke.

Professional baseball
In 1890 Robinson played professional baseball for Derby Baseball Club in the National League of Baseball of Great Britain. Robinson played alongside Steve Bloomer and helped them become British champions twice in the 1890s.

Career statistics

Club
Source:

International
Source:

Honours

Footballer
Derby County
Football League First Division runners-up: 1895–96

Southampton
FA Cup finalists: 1900, 1902
Southern League champions: 1898–99, 1900–01, 1902–03

England
British champions: 1898, 1899, 1901, 1903 (shared)

Baseball player
Derby County
British Champions: 1895, 1897

Footnotes
 According to the Southampton F.C. histories, the club's first tour of Europe was in April 1901. Among their opponents on that tour were Vienna Cricket & Football Club, who were defeated 7–0 and a Vienna Combined XI who were defeated 8–0.

References

Bibliography

External links
 
 Robinson and baseball
Robinson at Plymouth Argyle fansite

1870 births
1931 deaths
Footballers from Derby
English footballers
England international footballers
English Football League players
 English baseball players
Southern Football League players
Western Football League players
Association football goalkeepers
Derby Midland F.C. players
Lincoln City F.C. players
Derby County F.C. players
New Brighton Tower F.C. players
Southampton F.C. players
Plymouth Argyle F.C. players
Exeter City F.C. players
Millwall F.C. players
Stoke City F.C. players
19th-century baseball players
Green Waves F.C. players
FA Cup Final players